Lady Jane Seymour (c.1541 – 19 March 1561) was an influential writer during the sixteenth century in England, along with her sisters, Lady Margaret Seymour and Anne Seymour, Countess of Warwick. They were the children of Edward Seymour, 1st Duke of Somerset, who from 1547 was the Lord Protector of England after the death of King Henry VIII and during the minority of Jane's first cousin, King Edward VI. She was baptised 22 February 1541, her godmothers were Lady Mary (the King's daughter, at the time declared illegitimate but later to become queen) and Katherine Howard, the fifth wife of Henry VIII, and queen at the time. Some sources say that Thomas Cromwell was her godfather, but this cannot be correct as he had been executed the year before.  Jane was thus the niece of Henry VIII's third wife, Queen Jane, whom she was probably named after. She was the sole witness to the secret marriage of her brother Edward to Lady Katherine Grey (a potential heir to Queen Elizabeth I) in 1560. She died a year later, aged 20, probably of tuberculosis.

The Seymour sisters tended to work together, with their most famous work being a collection of 103 Latin distichs, Hecatodistichon, for the tomb of Margaret of Valois, queen of Navarre and also an author, which was published in 1550.

References

1540s births
1561 deaths
16th-century deaths from tuberculosis
Daughters of English dukes
16th-century English women writers
16th-century English writers
Jane
Tuberculosis deaths in England
16th-century Latin-language writers
New Latin-language poets